Mohammad Amin (22 January 1928 – 15 December 2012) was an Indian historian. He was the vice chancellor of Jamia Hamdard; taught History at St. Stephen's College, Delhi University for four decades; and was awarded the Padma Bhushan in 2010.

Early life and career

Amin was born at Qasba Mau-Aima, on the banks of River Ganges, in Allahabad district of the former United Provinces.

Amin was married to Khurshid and the couple had a son, Shahid Amin, the historian and Rhodes Scholar, and a daughter, Ghazala, who is herself a media personality and a teacher.

His school education started in Allahabad, from where he moved to Mughal Sarai and finally to Queens Collegiate School in Banares. Subsequently, he took a graduate degree in history from Allahabad University, in 1945, under the renowned historian, Sir Shafaat Ahmed Khan. He earned his master's degree from Aligarh Muslim University in 1949, in both history and law.

Academic
Mohammad Amin started his career, as a lawyer, in 1947, practising under a lawyer, Bachchan. However, his career as a lawyer was short-lived and he joined St. Stephen's College, Delhi, as a lecturer in 1949, although in between he studied at Cornell University where he secured a master's degree in 1952 and later at Stanford University (1962). He taught at St. Stephen's for 39 years till he retired in 1989 as the Head of the Department of History.

He worked as an expert historian at Al Beruni Institute, on the invitation of the Government of Uzbekistan, from 1994–96.

Administrative
He was appointed as the vice-chancellor of Jamia Hamdard University in 1990 and worked there till 1993.

He was the chairman of the Governing Body of the Indira Gandhi Institute of Physical Education and Sports Sciences He held memberships of numerous governing bodies of educational institutions, such as the National Council of Population, the central advisory board of the Ministry of Culture, the advisory board of the Archaeological Survey of India and the board of trustees of the Victoria Memorial, Kolkata

Awards and recognitions
 Honorary Causa DLitt – Jamia Millia Islamia University – 2009
 Padma Bhushan – 2010

Death
Amin died on 15 December 2012, succumbing to age related illnesses, at the age of 84.

References

1928 births
2012 deaths
20th-century Indian educational theorists
20th-century Indian historians
Historians of South Asia
People from Allahabad district
Recipients of the Padma Bhushan in literature & education
Scholars from Uttar Pradesh